Ian Smart (born February 28, 1980 in Kingston, Jamaica) is a CFL kick returner and running back who is currently a free agent. He attended C.W. Post College and rushed for 2,536 yards in 2001.

In 2003, Smart attended New York Jets training camp but joined NFL Europe's now-defunct Scottish Claymores as a running back. He played 4 games with the NFL's Tampa Bay Buccaneers in 2004. He was on the Buccaneers's practice roster during the 2005 season. 

Smart played 4 seasons for BC Lions and replaced Aaron Lockett as their kick returner during the 2006 season. He became their backup running back when Alexis Bwenge became a fullback. Smart scored a 25-yard touchdown as running back for the BC Lions in their 2006 Grey Cup victory.

On February 25, 2010, Smart was released by the BC Lions.

1980 births
Living people
Sportspeople from Kingston, Jamaica
BC Lions players
LIU Post Pioneers football players
Canadian football return specialists
Canadian football running backs
Jamaican players of American football
Jamaican players of Canadian football
Scottish Claymores players
Tampa Bay Buccaneers players